Khao mak, also known as "Thai fermented sweet rice dessert", is a Thai dessert. The sticky rice used to prepare khao mak is fermented for several days, resulting in an alcohol content of just over one percent. It has a noticeable alcohol flavor with a sweet taste and is often packaged in banana leaves.

Look pang is the traditional fermentation starter used to make khao mak. Look pang is a starch ball which contains mold (Aspergillus species, Rhizopus species, and Mucor species) and yeast (Saccharomyces cerevisiae and Candida species) inoculum in rice flour mixed with herbs such as pepper, garlic and galangal as an antibacterial agent. Its shape is a semicircular with 3-4 cm diameter.

In Khuan Don District, Satun Province it is called tapai.

See also
 List of Thai desserts

References

Thai desserts and snacks
Thai cuisine
Glutinous rice dishes